Between Christian Rock and a Hard Place is the fourth studio album released by Washington, D.C. hardcore punk band Good Clean Fun. It was released in 2006 on Equal Vision Records.

Track list

References

2006 albums
Good Clean Fun (band) albums